José Serofia Palma O.P. (born 19 March 1950) is a Filipino prelate and a professed member of the Dominican Order who is currently serving as the Archbishop of Cebu since 15 October 2010. He had previously served as Archbishop of Palo in Leyte. He also served as president of the Catholic Bishops' Conference of the Philippines from 2011 to 2013.

Early life
Palma was born in Dingle, Iloilo, in the Archdiocese of Jaro. He studied philosophy at St. Vincent Ferrer Seminary and theological studies at the St. Joseph Regional Seminary. He received his licentiate in Sacred Theology at the Pontifical and Royal University of Santo Tomas in Manila, and was ordained a priest for the Archdiocese of Jaro on 21 August 1976.

Palma earned a doctorate from the Pontifical University of Saint Thomas, Angelicum in Rome in 1987 with a dissertation entitled Death as an Act: A Dialogue in Eschatology with Contemporary Theologians.

Priesthood
After a year as assistant priest at the Jaro Cathedral, he taught at his alma mater, St. Vincent Ferrer Seminary. After his studies in Rome, he became rector of the seminary until he was appointed rector of the major seminary of the Metropolitan Province of Jaro-the St. Joseph Regional Seminary, in 1988. Meanwhile, he also held various positions in several diocesan commissions. In 1997 he was made parish priest of the Parish of St Anthony of Padua in Barotac Nuevo, Iloilo (Archdiocese of Jaro). On 28 November 1997, Pope John Paul II appointed him Titular Bishop of Vazari Diddi and Auxiliary Bishop of Cebu. He was consecrated on 13 January 1998. Exactly a year later, he was made Bishop-Ordinary of the See of Calbayog.

As archbishop

Archbishop of Palo
On 18 March 2006, Palma was appointed Archbishop of Palo by Pope Benedict XVI, succeeding Archbishop-Emeritus Pedro R. Dean.

Archbishop of Cebu
On 15 October 2010 he was appointed Archbishop of Cebu, replacing Cardinal Ricardo Vidal, who had been archbishop for 29 years. He was installed on 13 January 2011 at the Cebu Metropolitan Cathedral. He served as vice-president of the Catholic Bishops Conference of the Philippines from 1 December 2009 until 11 July 2011 on which he was elected president.

In 2018 he joined the Order of Preachers.

Pope Francis named him a member of the Pontifical Council for Culture on 11 November 2019.

References

External links
Catholic Hierarchy Archbishop Jose S. Palma
Calbayog
Palo Archdiocese

21st-century Roman Catholic archbishops in the Philippines
1950 births
Living people
University of Santo Tomas alumni
Pontifical University of Saint Thomas Aquinas alumni
People from Iloilo
People from Cebu City
Dominican bishops
Visayan people
Roman Catholic archbishops of Cebu
Roman Catholic archbishops of Palo
Presidents of the Catholic Bishops' Conference of the Philippines